
The Grünsee ("Green Lake") is a small lake near Zermatt, Switzerland, which is fed by the Findel Glacier. It is quite remote and is only accessible by foot, a small hub of the many footpaths in the area.  There is a small hamlet nearby of the same name.

External links
 Zermatt Experience: Lakes

Lakes of Valais
Zermatt